Franco Piperno (born 5 January 1943) is a former communist militant from Italy. He is an associate professor of Condensed Matter Physics in the University of Calabria.

Biography
Piperno was born in Catanzaro.

After his expulsion, in 1969 he was suspected of having sabotaged a Boston Chemical plant, which produced defoliant used in the Vietnam War, but he was immediately released. In Rome he was an activist in the 1968 movement and in the summer 1969 he took part in the demonstration against Fiat in Turin.

In the late 1969, with Oreste Scalzone and Toni Negri, he was  one of the founders of the far-left organisation Potere Operaio, and later he was a member of Autonomia Operaia. He also led the wing of Potere Operaio called Lavoro Illegale ("Illegal Work")

With Toni Negri, Oreste Scalzone and others, he was charged for the publication of subversive magazines in 1979 but he escaped the capture. In 1980 he was absolved, but one year later he was  condemned to ten years of imprisonment in another trial  for insurrectional activity and participation to the kidnapping of Aldo Moro. In particular, he was accused of having acted as a negotiator (through one of the kidnappers, Valerio Morucci) between the Italian Socialist Party and the terrorists who were allegedly detaining Moro. Documents left by the journalist Mino Pecorelli after his murder also hinted at an involvement of Piperno in the kidnapping. Piperno then lived in exile for several years, first in France thanks to the Mitterrand doctrine and then in Canada, where he also obtained a position at the University of Montreal. Most of the charges were later dropped, and the sentence was reduced to four years.

Piperno returned to Italy from Canada in 1990 and became active locally in his hometown, Cosenza, creating the cultural association Ciroma. In January 1996 his car was hit by four handgun bullets. In May 1996 Piperno became a  member of the local council of the city of Cosenza.

See also
Autonomism
Primavalle Fire
Kidnapping of Aldo Moro

References

1943 births
Autonomism
Italian communists
Libertarian socialists
Living people
People from Catanzaro
Potere Operaio